Pulivendula (2008) is a town located in the YSR Kadapa district, a district of the Indian state of Andhra Pradesh.  It is a small town which became 3rd grade municipality in 2008 from nagar Panchayat. 

It is located in Pulivendula mandal and is the headquarters of the Pulivendala revenue division.

Geography
Pulivendula is located at meridian coordinates . It has an average elevation of 272 meters (895 feet).

Economy

Uranium mining

On 23 August 2007, the Cabinet Committee on Economic Affairs (CCEA) approved the establishment of a uranium mine and processing plant at Mabbuchintalapalli-Tummalapalle, about 15 km south of Pulivendula, at a total cost of 11.06 billion rupees ($269.9 million). The plant was established by the Uranium Corporation of India. The cornerstone was laid on 20 November 2007, by Y. S. Rajasekhara Reddy, Chief Minister of Andhra Pradesh.

Transport

Pulivendula has good infrastructure compared to other places in the Rayalaseema region, maintaining wide roads, an underground drainage system, and a ring road. Pulivendula is connected to Kadapa by a four-lane road similar to a national highway. The nearby villages are connected to Pulivendula by two-lane roads. Bus transport is available from the bus station.

Education

Primary and secondary education is provided by both government-aided and private schools, according to Andhra Pradesh's School Education Department. The language of instruction in various schools is English or Telugu. Institutions of higher education in Pulivendula include Loyola Degree College. A new Medical college and Hospital is going to set up in the coming years.

Notable people 
 Yeduguri Sandinti Rajasekhara Reddy Former Chief minister of United Andhra Pradesh State. The district has been named in his memory.

References

Cities and towns in Kadapa district